Villa Cortese is a comune (municipality) in the Province of Milan in the Italian region Lombardy, located about  northwest of Milan.

The administrative municipalities borders Legnano, San Giorgio su Legnano, Busto Garolfo and Dairago.

History 
The name Villa Cortese the union between the words Vicus (Villa) indicating the very first settlement and Curtis (Cortese) that refers to the bordering settlements. The toponym has later on evolved to Vilcortex, Vilacortexia and lastly Villa Cortese.

The discovery of a Roman sarcophagus dating back to the 1st century AD testifies to a settlement on the territory since the Roman era; the sarcophagus is now in the Guido Sutermeister Civic Museum in Legnano. The first document in which the town is mentioned is an act of 1261, with which the Provost and the Canons of the Convent of San Giorgio (which was located where the Visconteo Castle in Legnano now stands) certify the assets they hold between the Olona river, Villa Cortese and the Strada Dairasca which connected Legnano with Dairago. Also in the thirteenth century, Goffredo da Bussero in the Liber Notitiae Sanctorum Mediolani lists an altar dedicated to St. Victor martyr in the Villa Cortese site.

A parchment dated 1312 mentions the Scazzosi family, powerful in the area and also having properties in the surrounding areas; an Ambrogio Scazzosi appears in the list of Merchants of fine wool with brand and registration number, dated 9 November 1403, living in Villa Cortese and dependent on the Parish of Olgiate Olona, in the Duchy of Milan. Suppressed by Napoleon who annexed it to Dairago, the Municipality of Villa Cortese was restored by the Austrians, but again abolished in 1868 by Vittorio Emanuele II with the Royal decree 5192, which this time united it with Busto Garolfo, a neighboring and rival town. Municipal autonomy was finally restored almost a century later, on 13 October 1966. Villa Cortese was the birthplace of the comedian Giacomo Poretti of the trio Aldo Giovanni and Giacomo, the well-known industrialist Franco Tosi and the painter Piero Giunni.

Society 
The connection with neighboring municipalities is made by Movibus bus lines. Among the first Italian recycling municipalities, for years it has stabilized its separate collection at around 70%. The municipal building is equipped with a photovoltaic system for the production of electricity and hot water, as well as the middle and elementary schools. Any type of disposal is possible at the municipal platform. It has eight well-equipped public parks and a day of cleaning the woods is organized by the municipal administration. The traditional fair takes place at the end of September, while the characteristic Christmas markets are held in mid-December.

Demographic

Administration

Culture

Education

Schools 
 Kindergarten
 Primary School Giuseppe Pinciroli
 Middle School Papa Giovanni XXIII
 Technical institute (i.e. High School) Gregorio Mendel

Sport 

The name of Villa Cortese comes to the national sports news starting from the 2006-2007 season, when the MC-PietroCarnaghi, women's volleyball team, arrives from B2 to B1, the following year is promoted to A2 and in 2009 wins the playoff for enter the Serie A1. In 2010 the newly promoted to A1 won the Italian Cup, which she will repeat the following year. In the 2010-2011 season he made his debut in Europe in the Cev Champions League, reaching the semifinals the following season, as the smallest city ever to have succeeded. He faces his first three seasons of the championship as an absolute protagonist: two 2nd places and a 1st place in the regular season, three championship finals won, even touching the Scudetto by one point, during the tie-break (5th set) of Race 5 of the 2011-2012 Scudetto Finals.

References

External links
 Official website

Cities and towns in Lombardy